Agelasa is a genus of skeletonizing leaf beetles in the family Chrysomelidae. There are two described species in Agelasa, one extinct. They are found in the Palearctic.

Species
These two species belong to the genus Agelasa:
 Agelasa nigriceps Motschulsky, 1860
 † Agelasa sessilis Förster, 1891

References

Galerucinae
Chrysomelidae genera
Taxa named by Victor Motschulsky